The Hispanic College Fund Football Classic was a college football kickoff game played from 2000 to 2002 at various sites. In three years, the game was contested by teams in six states and was played in three locations.

Game results

Rankings are from the AP Poll.

Records

By team

By conference

Source

References 

College football kickoff games
Recurring sporting events established in 2000
Recurring sporting events disestablished in 2002